Brandon Neil Haunstrup (born 26 October 1996) is an English professional footballer who plays as a defender for EFL League One club Cambridge United.

Career

Portsmouth
Born in Waterlooville, Haunstrup progressed through Portsmouth's youth categories. He was offered a two-year scholarship contract on 3 July 2013.

On 7 January 2015, Haunstrup joined Bognor Regis Town on a youth experience loan. He made his debut for the club a day later, starting in a 3–4 away loss against Leatherhead;

On 25 June 2015, Haunstrup signed a one-year professional deal with Portsmouth, being promoted to the main squad. He made his professional debut on 12 August, starting in a 2–1 Football League Cup home win against Derby County. On 13 April 2016, his contract was extended until the summer of 2017.

Having played against them in a pre-season friendly in July 2016, on 19 October 2016 it was announced that Haunstrup would join National League team Sutton United on loan for one month. On 22 October, Haunstrup made his first appearance for Sutton as a substitute in a 1–1 away draw against Southport. He made his first full appearance for Sutton three days later on 25 October, in a 2–2 draw at home against Maidstone United.

On 8 June 2017, Haunstrup signed a new one-year contract at Pompey with the club holding an option for a further 12 months. At the end of the 2017–18 season, the club took up the option and extended his contract for a further year. Following a successful breakthrough season, in which he made 20 appearances in all competitions, the club further rewarded Haunstrup with a new two-year contract, running until the summer of 2020.

Kilmarnock 
On 22 July 2020, Scottish Premiership side Kilmarnock announced that they had signed Haunstrup on a two-year deal.

Cambridge United
On 6 July 2022, Haunstrup returned to England to join League One club Cambridge United on a two-year deal.

Career statistics

Honours
Portsmouth
League Two: 2016-17
EFL Trophy: 2018–19

References

External links

1996 births
Living people
People from Waterlooville
English footballers
Association football fullbacks
Isthmian League players
Portsmouth F.C. players
Bognor Regis Town F.C. players
Kilmarnock F.C. players
Cambridge United F.C. players
English Football League players
National League (English football) players
Scottish Professional Football League players
English people of Danish descent